Antonio Valdés González-Roldán (23 May 1926 – 10 October 2007) was a Spanish politician who served as Minister of Public Works of Spain between 1974 and 1976, during the Francoist dictatorship.

References

1926 births
2007 deaths
Public works ministers of Spain
Government ministers during the Francoist dictatorship